Pert Plus is an American brand of shampoo and conditioner (or 2-in-1) products. It was introduced in 1987 by Procter & Gamble as a reformulation of the existing Pert shampoo product introduced in 1980. It is known in New Zealand and Australia as Pert and in Asia as Rejoice.

History
Investment firm Najafi Companies acquired North American licensing rights to Pert Plus from P&G in 2006, moving its production to subsidiary Innovative Brands LLC. In 2010, Innovative sold Pert Plus and Sure to Helen of Troy. The company has several products for various hair types.

References

External links
 Official Pert Plus website

Former Procter & Gamble brands
Shampoo brands
Helen of Troy Limited